Thomas Hopkins (1616–1684) was an early settler of Providence Plantations and the great grandfather of brothers Esek Hopkins, the only Commander in Chief of the Continental Navy during the American Revolutionary War, and Stephen Hopkins who was many times colonial governor of Rhode Island and a signer of the Declaration of Independence.

Hopkins was baptized in Yeovilton, county Somerset, England on 7 April 1616, the son of William Hopkins and Joane (Arnold) Hopkins.  His mother was the sister of early Providence settler William Arnold and the daughter of Nicholas and Alice (Gully) Arnold of Northover and Ilchester in Somerset.  Hopkins' mother died when he was five years old, after which he and his sister Frances were probably taken into the family of their Uncle William Arnold, and most writers on his early history agree that he sailed to New England at age 19 with his uncle's family in 1635.  On the same ship was his first cousin Benedict Arnold, also aged 19, the future governor of the Rhode Island colony.

The Arnolds first settled in Hingham in the Massachusetts Bay Colony, but they remained there less than a year. They joined Roger Williams in April 1636 and were among the first settlers of Providence Plantations.  Soon after, they were the first English settlers on the Pawtuxet River, the southern edge of Williams's Providence purchase.  Hopkins was not yet of age when they settled here, but when he reached his majority he was one of 39 signers of an agreement in 1640 to form a government in Providence, signing his name with a mark.

From 1652 to 1672, Hopkins served in a number of civic positions in Providence, including Commissioner, Deputy, and member of the Town Council.  In 1676, King Philip's War raged in Rhode Island, and all of the Pawtuxet settlement and most of Providence were destroyed.  Hopkins' oldest sons William and Thomas either remained in Providence or returned there shortly after the war. After the death of his youngest son Joseph, Hopkins, his daughter-in-law Elizabeth and her two children Ichabod and Anna, moved to Oyster Bay on Long Island in the Province of New York and remained there. His daughter-in-law Elizabeth then married Richard Kirby.  Hopkins was living in the home of Kirby when he died in 1684.

See also

 List of early settlers of Rhode Island
 Colony of Rhode Island and Providence Plantations

Images

References

Bibliography

External links
Rhode Island History from the State of Rhode Island General Assembly website.  See Chapter 2, Colonial Era.

1616 births
1684 deaths
People from Providence, Rhode Island
People of colonial Rhode Island
People from Somerset
English emigrants